Belmin Dizdarević (born 9 August 2001) is a Bosnian professional footballer who plays as a goalkeeper for Bosnian Premier League club Sarajevo and the Bosnia and Herzegovina national team.

On 25 May 2019, in a league game against GOŠK Gabela, he became the second youngest goalkeeper to ever make an official appearance for Sarajevo.

Career statistics

International

Honours
Sarajevo
Bosnian Premier League: 2018–19, 2019–20
Bosnian Cup: 2018–19

References

External links

2001 births
Living people
Sportspeople from Zenica
Bosnia and Herzegovina footballers
Bosnia and Herzegovina youth international footballers
Bosnia and Herzegovina under-21 international footballers
Association football goalkeepers
Premier League of Bosnia and Herzegovina players
FK Sarajevo players
FK Mladost Doboj Kakanj players